Benjamin McMurray (born 24 February 1962) is a Filipino judoka. He competed in the men's heavyweight event at the 1988 Summer Olympics.

References

External links
 

1962 births
Living people
Filipino male judoka
Olympic judoka of the Philippines
Judoka at the 1988 Summer Olympics
Place of birth missing (living people)